St Elphins School was a boarding school for the daughters of the clergy of the Church of England. It was originally based in Warrington, Lancashire, England. It moved to Darley Dale, a rural area near Matlock, Derbyshire, in 1904, as the Warrington area had changed from open countryside and become highly industrialised. The school was founded in 1844 but had roots back to 1697. The school abruptly closed in March 2005 following financial problems.

History
The school opened on 15 March 1844 in Warrington, dedicated to Saint Elphin who according to tradition founded Warrington's parish church. In 1857 the objectives of the school were: to provide a good education on advantageous terms: (i) to orphan daughters of clergy from the Archdeaconries of Manchester, Liverpool and Chester; (iii) to the daughters of clergy still working in these Archdeaconries; (iii) to the daughters of clergy from any diocese.

The original site in Warrington was in the country. However, by the turn of the 20th century, the area had become industrialised, and the move to the countryside in Darley Dale was made. The building occupied had previously been the Darly Dale Hydro, a hydrotherapy health spa.

During the period up to 1944, various additional facilities were made to the school and the criteria for pupils were extended to daughters of lay members of the Church of England.

In 2003, the school fell into financial difficulties and went into administration with debts of £3 million. A proposal was put forward to develop part of the site for housing and thus raise income to save the school. This was rejected by the local council, and the school closed in 2005. In December 2010 a website was published about the school and is regularly updated with photographs, information, magazines and news items.

Following the closure of the school, the site was acquired in 2006 and developed into a luxury retirement village, the main building being converted into retirement flats.

Alumni

 Ruth Adam (1907-1977) Feminist writer
 Richmal Crompton (1890–1969), English writer of Just William
 Florence Mahoney (1929-) the first Gambian woman to obtain a PhD
 Mabel Joyce Maw - member of Ferguson's Gang

See also
 St Elphin's Church, Warrington

References

External links
 Official website

Defunct schools in Derbyshire
Educational institutions established in 1844
1844 establishments in England
Educational institutions disestablished in 2005
2005 disestablishments in England
Boarding schools in Derbyshire
Defunct boarding schools in England